Bahuchithawadiya (The Undecided) is an upcoming Sri Lankan Sinhala drama romance film directed and produced by Malaka Dewapriya. It stars Kalana Gunasekara and Veena Jayakody in lead roles along with Lakshman Mendis, Samanalee Fonseka and Damitha Abeyratne. Music composed by Chitral Somapala.

in Sinhala language ‘Bahu’ means multiple and ‘Chitha’ means thoughts.  ‘Bahuchithawadiya’ simply means ‘one in many minds’ or ‘one who lacks single-mindedness’. In other words ‘an undecided mind’ The term ‘Bahuchithawadiya’ was coined to denote the nature of our youth in contemporary society in Sri Lanka.

It is the debut feature film by Malaka Dewapriya and film has awarded in many film festivals. The film received many positive reviews from critics.

Plot
Sasitha works as the underpaid delivery man for Giftnet, an Internet-based business which accepts gift orders from outside Sri Lanka. Suffocated by economic pressures and sexual frustrations, like most of his peers he sees going abroad as the only way out of his wretched existence. Fascinated with the idea of "abroad" he forms relationships with the recipients of these gifts, most of whom are rich, lonely women. When the real world starts to look too bleak, Sasitha seeks greener pastures through virtual relationships he builds on Facebook and Skype with Sri Lankan women of his own class, working abroad. But when nothing seems to go right, he grows desperate

Cast
 Kalana Gunasekara as Sasitha
 Veena Jayakody as Iranganie
 Lakshman Mendis as Boss
 Samanalee Fonseka as Kumari
 Nilmini Buwaneka as Sasitha's Sister
 Damitha Abeyratne as Kanthi
 Sulochana Vithanarachchi as Nirmala
 Geetha Alahakoon as Sasitha's Girl friend Kanchana
 Rajitha Hewathanthrige as Sasitha's friend
 D.B. Gangodathenna as Old man
 Prasadini Athapattu as Wife of Sasitha's friend
 Omali Radhika as Cyber friend Samadhi

International and local recognition
 Screened at Cinema of tomorrow 2018– 5thDerana Film Awards
 Screened at 40th Moscow International Film Festival 2018
 Screened at Independents Film Festival in Karlsruhe, Germany 2018 
Screened at 34th Sarasaviya Awards 
Screened at – 8th SAARC Film Festival 2018 
 Screened at 26th Loveisfolly International Film festival in Bulgaria 2018
 Scheduled to Screened at International Cinema Festival in Jaffna 2018
 Screened at Kazan International Festival 2018

Accolades

References

External links
 
 Nodutu Cinemawa” – Analysis of Sri Lankan movie directed by Malaka Dewapriya “The Udecided” (Bahuchithawadiya)

Sinhala-language films